is a party video game for the GameCube and PlayStation 2 based on the One Piece anime. One Piece: Pirates' Carnival comprises over 30 different minigames, which support up to four players, and includes a Reversi-like board game mode in which winning minigames lets you take control of squares and recruit pirates for your ship's crew. It uses the opening  in the Japanese version.

Gameplay
The main style of gameplay is the Board Game, which features a massive gameboard consisting of dozens of panels. The objective of the game is to have as much money as possible when every tile belongs to a player. Each player has two varieties of money - the money earned from winning a minigame and the money earned from simply owning a panel. Note that while the latter is easily increased (and just as easily decreased), only three effects in the entire game can affect the former.

Each of the four players take turns uncovering panels around the gameboard; who goes first is determined by a minigame at the beginning that takes place at the center panel. While at the beginning, players can only uncover panels that are close to the central one, as the game goes on, more panels may be uncovered. A panel owned by a player is marked by being bordered with the player's colors; if the color is gray, then nobody owns it and anyone can select it.

Similar to One Piece: Grand Battle! Rush, some gameplay items and features were removed from the American version because the American version of the anime had not progressed as far as the Japanese version (Everything past the Skypiea Arc of the anime was removed) and the soundtrack of the introduction of the game was changed because 4Kids' version of the anime never used any of the original theme songs.

Game boards
There are 5 kinds of boards in the game, each one representation a place from the story. The shape and size of each board is different for the others'.

They are based in East Blue, Calm Belt to Alabasta, Skypiea, Water 7 and Longring Longland.

Panels
There are three types of panels on the gameboard:

Event: These panels, when uncovered, results in the player who uncovered them immediately gaining ownership of them. All event panels have some sort of effect, from increasing/decreasing the player's money to gaining ownership of a panel that an opponent owns.

Mini-Game: These panels, when uncovered, list a trio of minigames, one of which the player that uncovered it chooses to engage in with all the other players. The winner of the minigame gains ownership of the panel.

Captain: These panels, when uncovered, result in a special minigame where the player who uncovers them plays as the captain of the game, and follows different rules than all the other players. If the captain wins, the player who uncovered the panel earns ownership of it, while if one of the other players win, they gain ownership of it. Note that captain panels are always found in pairs, and that if a player gains ownership of one, the other is also revealed and brought under ownership of him/her. Similarly, captain panels also change ownership/get destroyed/get frozen in unison.

Note that if two panels of the same color are in line with one another, all uncovered panels between them with different colors switch to the color of the two panels on the edges, and are brought under ownership of the player with the color.

Versus Game
Any game that the player has participated is automatically added to the Versus Game section, to be played whenever they feel like it. The games are classified into these categories:

Mini-Game
Usually only uncovered by the Mini-Game panel. These include:

Ship Battle Royale: Players battle each other on board the Going Merry.

Pirates' Concentration: Players take turns flipping over tiles featuring members of the Straw Hat crew on a giant raft, searching for matches.

Going Merry Shooting Gallery: Players use the Going Merry's cannon to shoot islands & ships to gain points.

The Great Smoke Escape: Players search for keys in the Loguetown Marine HQ while avoiding Smoker/Chaser.

Snowcap Battle Hiking: Players climb up the Drum Rockies, encountering various obstacles (such as hiking bears and Lapahns) along the way.

Yuba Sand Digout: Players dig for water in Yuba while avoiding sandstorms.

Kung Fu Dugong Punch Out: Players have their own territory and take out the Kung-Fu Dugongs in order to win with less Dugongs.

Supersonic Ledge Race: Players ride spot-billed ducks up the Alubarna Plateau.

Sunken Treasure Salvage: Players explore a sunken ship in diving suits, searching for treasure while avoiding the punches of Masira.

Balloon Dive Chicken Race: Players use the octopus balloon to descend from Skypiea and onto the Going Merry.

Battle of the Long Stilts: Players walk within a ring on massive stilts, attempting to knock each other over.

Where Is Pandaman?: Players use a telescope to search for Pandaman in a large crowd.

Straw Hat Members' Games
Unlike the other Captain Games, the Straw Hats' panels cannot be uncovered in a board game. The only way to play these games is to challenge a member's tile over a Davy Back Fight.

In "Gum Gum Carnival", players try to select certain beats in a tune while avoid being hit by Luffy. The last one standing is the winner.

"Thundering Swordplay" is played in a ring, which is slippery from the rain. There, players must put Zoro/Zolo out of the ring. Whoever defeats him wins, unless he defeats the other players. If so then he wins.

In "Loguetown Treasure Chase", Nami is chased by players on the streets of Loguetown. The players who successfully steals Nami's treasure three times wins, unless she makes it to the Going Merry. If so then she wins.

In "Defend Usopp Factory!", players attempt to steal treasure from one of three doors. Usopp stands in the middle, and must choose a door to protect.

"Cooking Fighter" is played in the Baratie, where the players attempt to steal food aboard the Baratie as Sanji throws it to Patty. Forks can be used to slow down the other players. Whoever steals three dishes first wins, unless Sanji delivers five dishes to Patty before then. If so then he wins.

"Wave the Pirate Flag!" takes place in Drum Island, where the players attempt to steal a pirate flag from Chopper upon Drum Castle and wave it to fill a gauge. Chopper himself must place the flag upon each of the castle's seven sections and turn the snow pink.

In "The Ancient Ruin Mystery", players attempt to steal treasure from the ruins of Shandora and bring it back to their own camp while Robin is deciphering pone cliffs. The player who acquires 100,000 berries wins, unless Robin completely deciphers the pone cliffs. If so then she wins.

Captain Games
The player who uncovers a captain tile gets to play as the captain. All the other players face off against them in a mini-game. Once in a while, captains will mutiny, and all four players battle against them.

Chop-Chop Festival: Players battle Buggy by stepping on either his head or lower body. Buggy himself can attack of his own will and go into a "berserker" mode whenever he is hit. Mohji and Cabaji will also be firing cannonballs at the players.

The Cat Out of the Bag: Players battle Kuro in Kaya's front yard while avoiding Jango's hypnosis. Kuro himself can create a trail of light when he starts running, and can surround players with it, attacking them all at once with his "Out of the Bag Attack".

Beware the MH5!: Players jump across the pieces of Baratie's fins and Krieg's ship to reach Don Krieg himself. The entire stage is covered with poison gas, and players must periodically acquire gas masks to deplete their poison meter, or they will die. Krieg himself can hinder players with spears and (if he acquires one) bombs.

Arlong Darts Park: Players engage in a game of darts at Arlong Park. Arlong himself takes his turn after all three players, and only gets three shots as opposed to the other players getting four. However, he can knock down other players' darts to steal their points, and the three spots that he chose form a triangle. Any darts within the triangle instantly have their score stolen by Arlong.

Little Garden Bomb Battle: Players battle the giants Dorry and Brogy on Little Garden by tossing bombs at the giants' feet. Dorry and Broggy can retaliate by stepping on the players, guided by a skull mark.

Wapol's Munch-Munch Factory: Players battle a rotating Wapol (in the center of the stage) by hitting his heart, which pops out at a random spot every time he attacks. In addition to using cannons and hammers, Wapol can also devour anyone who he is facing, filling up a gauge. When the gauge is filled, Wapol can engage in a secret technique that attacks all opponents.

Clone-Clone Panel Shootout: Players engage in a guessing game with Mr. 2 Bon Clay at the Sandora River, trying to guess which face he has transformed into.

Mr. 4's Batter Up!: Players attempt to deflect exploding baseballs that Mr. 4 hits toward them. In addition to normal baseball bombs, Mr. 4 can also have Lasso sneeze out up to three "tornado shots" that automatically explode.

Crocodile's Sand Trap: Players battle Crocodile with water guns while attempting to not get sucked into the "Desert Girasole". Crocodile himself can dodge water shots and retaliate with Desert Spada and sandstorms.

Chomp It Up! Pie Eatout: Players engage in a pie-eating contest with Blackbeard, and must avoid bombs. Blackbeard himself can use an apple bomb whenever Doc Q shows up, causing three apples to appear before each of the players, at least one of which is a bomb (the exploding apples do not reveal themselves until a few seconds later).

Spring Hopper Daredevil: Players attempt to dodge Bellamy's bouncing attacks in Mock Town while trying to make it through all three sections. Bellamy himself creates a hole in the dock wherever he lands if he does not hit anybody, and these holes cause instant death if a player falls through them. If two or more have survived all three sections of Mock Town, Bellamy goes into a frenzied "Spring Hopper" that does not stop until there is only one player left standing.

Wyper Strikes!: Players must stop Wyper from destroying the Going Merry by absorbing his bazooka shots. Wyper himself can fire an extra-potent shot if he stops firing for a while.

Illusion Forest, Ordeal of Orbs: Players must knock exploding Surprise Orbs toward Satori. Satori himself can either deflect them with his cane or connect Surprise Orbs to the one that he is standing on, and once he has connected four, he can use the Orb Dragon technique, which allows him to hurt players just by touching them.

Light the Shandorian Fire!: Players must reach the Golden Bell by climbing up Giant Jack and avoiding a rotating thunder cloud. Enel follows the players on another cloud, and attacks them with "30,000,000 Volt Hino" (which is horizontal) and "El Thor" (which is vertical).

The Suitcase Scramble: Players must take three suitcases full of money back to their own area. Smoker/Chaser (Paulie in the Japanese version) snatches the suitcases away from the players. Hammers can be used to attack him, attack other players, or knock a suitcase out of another player's area.

Chop-Chop Harpoon Mayhem!: Players collect treasure while avoiding Buggy's attacks (Franky's attacks in the Japanese version) and the junk fired out of the cannons. He can grab players and toss them into the cannon, firing them out.

Pandaman's Panic Maze: Players avoid flames while breaking down doors in a maze-like burning mansion. When a blue arrow appears, players can escape the mansion by getting to it in time. Pandaman (Blueno in the Japanese version) travels through walls to attack the players, and can alter the direction of the flames up to three times.

Twirling Whips of Flame: Players must avoid Mohji & Cabaji (Kaku & Kalifa in the Japanese version) running over them with a whip while attempting to toss them into a fire. The duo can stop at any time and start spinning in a circle, increasing the range of their attack.

Lucci's game (Original version only): Players run through a devastated and burning Galley-la building, while Rob Lucci chases them and attempts to stop them by throwing burning furniture and utilizing his six form techniques.

Reception

The game was met with very mixed to negative reception upon release. GameRankings gave it a score of 51% and 47 out of 100 for the PlayStation 2 version, and 45% and 49 out of 100 for the GameCube version.  In Japan, Famitsu gave the game a score of one seven and three sixes, bringing it to a total of 25 out of 40. Famitsu Cube + Advance, however, gave the GameCube version a score of one nine, two eights, and one seven, bringing it to a total of 32 out of 40.

References

Notes

External links

Bandai America's Official Website (archived)
Bandai Official Website (Japanese)

2005 video games
GameCube games
H.a.n.d. games
Multiplayer and single-player video games
Pirates Carnival
Party video games
PlayStation 2 games
Toei Animation video game projects
Video games developed in Japan